Fairweather Glacier is a  long   glacier in Glacier Bay National Park and Preserve in the U.S. state of Alaska. It begins on the west slope of Mount Salisbury and continues west to its 1961 terminus 0.2 miles (300 m) east of Cape Fairweather, 100 miles (161 km) northwest of Hoonah.

Fairweather Glacier is the namesake of the Alaska Marine Highway fast ferry MV Fairweather.

References

See also
 List of glaciers

Glaciers of Glacier Bay National Park and Preserve
Glaciers of Hoonah–Angoon Census Area, Alaska
Glaciers of Unorganized Borough, Alaska